Albury is a village and civil parish in the borough of Guildford in Surrey, England, about  south-east of Guildford town centre. The village is within the Surrey Hills Area of Outstanding Natural Beauty. Farley Green, Little London and adjacent Brook form part of the civil parish.

Geography and economy
Albury civil parish spans the small village and three hamlets, which are Farley Green, Little London and adjacent Brook – spaced out by Albury Heath, Foxholes Wood, small fields and Albury Park.  About a third of Blackheath Common on the Greensand Ridge is in the parish, which centrally nestles in the 'Vale of Holmesdale'.  The old village lay within what is now Albury Park. Albury new village is at the point where the Sherborne, flowing from near Newlands Corner via the Silent Pool, joins the Tillingbourne that runs through the centre of the village and until the 20th century powered Albury flour mill at the Chilworth edge of the village. The mill is now converted into offices and apartments. There is another watercourse leading into the Tillingbourne at Chilworth, the Law Brook, which the hamlet of Brook is centred on.

The  of Colyers Hanger SSSI, an area of ancient woodland, is in the parish of Albury.

According to the 2011 Census, the population was 1,191.  This was an increase of one since 2001 when the population lived in 527 homes (52 of which had their lowest floor level above street level and 298 of which were owner-occupied).  While 583 people were economically active: 372 commuted by motor vehicle and 61 commuted by public transport, the average Albury commuter travelled .

The village has a post office and general shop, and the Drummond at Albury inn; Little London has another public house the William IV which dates back to the 16th century.

History

The name “Albury” derives from the Old English ald (old) and burh (fortification).

Farley Heath in the southwest of the parish has remains of a Romano-Celtic temple within a temenos in a clearing by Heath Road containing an inner cella, nearby a pottery kiln and tumbled columns can be seen.

The village appears in the Domesday Book as Eldeberie. It was held by Roger d'Abernon from Richard de Tonebrige. Its Domesday Assets were: 2½ hides, 1 church, 1 mill worth 5s, 8½ ploughs,  of meadow, woodland worth 30 hogs. It rendered £9.
Within it is the Saxon church, the Mansion or Albury Park House, a Grade II* listed building. (now a retirement home), and a few surviving houses of the old village. In 1842, Henry Drummond moved the rest of the village half a mile westward to what was originally the hamlet of Weston Street, where he also built a new church. The Duke of Northumberland owns the estate – the Mansion was once home to the Duke and Duchess. The gardens are designated Grade I and were designed by author and gardener John Evelyn whose family home was nearby at Wotton,  to the east.

Sports
Fishing is available in the stocked Albury Estate ponds at Weston, Vale End, Albury Park and at Powder Mills, Chilworth with the Albury Estate Fisheries club.

Albury Cricket Club play at the Albury Heath ground that adjoins Albury Eagles FC, close to Albury and to Little London in Sandy Lane, the clubs have a combined social events calendar.  The football club has several U16, U13 and U9 teams.

Churches

The parish of Albury has four churches:
 The parish church of St Peter and St Paul, built 1842 by McIntosh Brooks in red brick as a copy of the 12th-century Église Saint-Pierre [fr], Thaon, Normandy. The transept and apse were added in 1868 by Sir Arthur Blomfield, and the north chapel created as a Second World War memorial by neo-gothicist Sir Edward Maufe, designer of Guildford Cathedral.
 The Barn church, St Michael's in Farley Green.
 Old St Peter and St Paul's Church, a church of Saxon origin with 12th-century tower, 13th-century chancel, 14th-century nave and 16th-century north porch, Drummond Chapel (with marble chest tomb) and south window with quatrefoil renewed by Pugin: in Albury Park in the care of the Churches Conservation Trust, a Grade I listed building.
 The Catholic Apostolic Church graded II*, also built by McIntosh Brooks, is by the Sherbourne brook at the northeast end of the village street near to where it joins the A25.

Demography and housing

The average level of accommodation in the region composed of detached houses was 28%, the average which were apartments was 22.6%.

The proportion of households in the civil parish who owned their home outright compares to the regional average of 35.1%.  The proportion who owned their home with a loan compares to the regional average of 32.5%.  The remaining % is made up of rented dwellings (plus a negligible % of households living rent-free).

Albury landfill

Albury had one of the two active landfill sites in Surrey; it only took household waste. This, now sealed, landfill ceased accepting waste delivery in 2014 and is generating biomethane which in turn generates revenue for Albury Estate.

References

External links

 Albury Parish Council
 Albury History
 Albury History Society
 Albury website
 

Villages in Surrey
Borough of Guildford
Civil parishes in Surrey